Caucho Technology is based in San Diego, CA. It is an information technology company that produces web server software and application server software as well as the originators of Quercus and Hessian open source projects.

Caucho Technology was founded in 1998.

Caucho was mentioned in 2012 as a visionary vendor by Gartner. Resin Server, Caucho's flagship product, was mentioned in the February 2012 Netcraft report as growing by a factor of ten in 2011.

Products
The Resin server project was started in 1997. The first version was released in 1998. Resin is both a web server and an application server. Resin is dual licensed as GPL and commercial.

Quercus, an open source standalone project that is part of Resin, is a PHP clone written in Java with speeds that exceed standard PHP.

Hessian, another open source project from Caucho, is a binary web service protocol similar in concept to Google protocol buffers and BSON but predating them by almost a decade.

Chronology
 2018: Caucho celebrates 20 Year Anniversary
 2018: Korea Chamber of Commerce & Industry achieves nationwide scalability using Resin clustering
 2018: Resin Embedded adds support for Spring Boot command line deployment
 2017: Caucho partners with the NTT Data Intramart Figtree Innovation Centre in Sydney to develop performance, cloud and security solutions
 2017: Caucho presents Baratine Microservices at Devoxx 2017 Conference
 2017: Caucho expands South Korean market through partnership with Xest Information Technology. Customers include Samsung, Ministry of National Defense and Korea Coast Guard
 2017: NTT Data Intramart achieves 5,500 customer sales — powered by Resin
 2016: Caucho introduces ultra fast and single-threaded Baratine GPL microservices framework
 2016: Mitsubishi Corporation, Toyota Administration Corporation and Namco Bandai Holdings Inc. run on Resin as part of Caucho's partnership with NTT Data Intramart
 2015: Caucho expands reseller and OEM program throughout Southeast Asia, Russia, India and the Middle East
 2014: Caucho begins work on Baratine, a new distributed in-memory Java service platform
 2013: Caucho celebrates 15-year anniversary!
 2012: Netcraft reports 4.7 million sites deployed on Resin
 2011: Caucho named “Cool Vendor” and “Visionary” by Gartner
 2011: Resin Pro Cloud Optimized and Web Profile certified
 2010: Resin leads Web Profile technology and keynotes TheServerSide Java Symposium
 2009: Significant Cloud Support and Administration feature enhancements
 2008: Introduction of Resin 3rd generation clustering and CDI
 2007: Resin 3.1 released
 2006: Japan's largest online gaming portal deploys on Resin
 2006: Caucho releases Quercus, a PHP-Java implemented in 100% Java
 2005: Caucho becomes a Sun Microsystem J2EE licensee
 2004: Hessian 1.0 spec released
 2003: e-gatematrix deploys on Resin
 2002: CNET deploys on Resin
 2001: AltaVista search deploys on Resin
 2001: Caucho & NTT Data Intramart launch partnership
 2000: Salesforce deploys on Resin
 1999: Resin 1.0 released
 1998: Caucho founded with the goal to provide lightweight and high performance Java solutions

See also
Comparison of web server software
Comparison of lightweight web servers
Comparison of application servers

References

Technology companies established in 1998
Companies based in San Diego